Problepsis ocellata is a moth of the family Geometridae. It is found in Andorra, Greece, Crete, Cyprus, Turkey and the Near East.

The larvae feed on Olea europaea.

Subspecies
Problepsis ocellata ocellata
Problepsis ocellata cinerea (Butler, 1886)

References

Moths described in 1845
Scopulini
Moths of Europe
Moths of Asia